Rossiglione (locally  /) is a comune (municipality) in the Metropolitan City of Genoa in the Italian region Liguria, located about  northwest of Genoa.

Rossiglione borders the following municipalities: Belforte Monferrato, Bosio, Campo Ligure, Molare, Ovada, Tagliolo Monferrato, Tiglieto.

Nature conservation 
Part of the municipality territory is within the boundaries of the Parco naturale regionale del Beigua.

Asteroid 
Asteroid 9101 Rossiglione, discovered by astronomers at the Farra d'Isonzo Observatory in 1996, was named after the Italian village. The official  was published by the Minor Planet Center on 8 November 2019.

References

External links 
 Official website

Cities and towns in Liguria